Hans Humes (born Willem J. Humes) is an American investor and commentator on financial markets and sovereign debt restructurings. He is the president and chief investment officer at Greylock Capital Management, an alternative investment adviser. He served as co-chair of the Global Committee of Argentina Bondholders following the 1998–2002 Argentine great depression, and most recently served on the steering committee of investors engaged in the Greek sovereign debt restructuring.

Early life and education
Humes was born in Bethesda, Maryland and spent his childhood in Canada, Mexico, Nigeria, Morocco, and Chile. He completed high school at The Lawrenceville School in 1983 and matriculated at Williams College that same year, earning a Bachelor of Arts degree in literature in 1987. Humes captained the Williams College Ultimate Frisbee team, otherwise known as 'WUFO', during the 1985-86 academic year.

Career
After graduating from Williams College, Humes entered investment banking working for Manufacturer’s Hanover, then Banco Santander and then Lehman Brothers, focusing on proprietary debt trading in Latin America. At Lehman Brothers, he was a member of the emerging markets debt trading team and helped manage over $500 million of assets. He subsequently joined Van Eck Global as a portfolio manager for a fund engaged in emerging market fixed-income investments. In 2004, Humes founded Greylock Capital as a joint venture with Van Eck Global managing a portfolio similar to the one he managed at Van Eck Global. He currently serves as the firm's president and chief investment officer.

Greylock Capital is an Securities and Exchange Commission registered alternative investment adviser that invests in investing in undervalued, distressed, and high yield assets worldwide, particularly in emerging markets. Greylock Capital and its partners have participated on a number of corporate and sovereign debt restructurings. In addition to the sovereign restructurings of Argentina and Greece, Humes and Greylock Capital participated in the restructurings of Republics of Ivory Coast (2010), Ecuador (2009) and Liberia (2009).

Humes is a regular contributor to public debate through his television and radio appearances and newspaper interviews. His commentary often focuses on strategy and developing trends related to emerging markets investments and sovereign debt restructurings.

Personal life
Humes engages in a number of civic and charitable endeavors, including serving on the boards of the New York Theatre Workshop and the MacDella Cooper Foundation, a foundation established to improve the lives of Liberian orphans. He is also on the board of directors of the Wendy Hilliard Foundation, a foundation which offers gymnastics training and instruction to girls in the NY metropolitan area. Additionally, he sits on the Advisory Board of the World Policy Institute, a New York City-based international affairs think tank.

Humes is fluent in Spanish.

References

External links
 Greylock Capital website
 Wendy Hilliard Foundation
 MacDella Cooper Foundation
 New York Theatre Workshop

People from Bethesda, Maryland
American investors
Year of birth missing (living people)
Living people
Williams College alumni
Lawrenceville School alumni